Gisella Orsini (born 8 December 1971) is a born Swiss female writer and former racewalker, who won a silver medal with the Italian team at the World Race Walking Cup.

Biography
At the end of her career as an athlete she started writing as a writer, winning prizes with her books, such as in 2016 Veleno nelle gole (Poison in the throats) and with the following ones.

Achievements

National titles
 Italian Athletics Championships
 20 km walk: 2006, 2007

See also
 Italian team at the running events
 Italy at the IAAF World Race Walking Cup
 Italy at the European Race Walking Cup

References

External links
 

1971 births
Living people
Italian women writers
Italian female racewalkers
Athletics competitors of Gruppo Sportivo Forestale
World Athletics Championships athletes for Italy